The South London Football Alliance was a football competition based in South London, England. It was founded in 1920 and had in its last season 2016/17 a total of 2 divisions with 23 teams. The league was not part of the English football league system as it was not a feeder league within the football pyramid. However it generally fed the Kent County League's bottom divisions, Division Three East and Division Three West.

In 2017 it merged with the Bromley and District Football League to form the Bromley and South London League.

The league was affiliated to the London Football Association and Kent County Football Association.

History
The South London Football Alliance was formed in 1920 and began operating for competitive play in Season 1921/22. Johnson & Phillips are the only founder member of the league that remain in membership. The area covered by the competition membership was 15 miles from Beresford Square, Woolwich. Other competitions which come under the umbrella of the league were:

Queen Mary Charity Cup (formed in 1926)
Elizabeth Jaques Charity Cup (formed in 1947)

Member clubs 2016–17
The league's member clubs in its last season were as follows:

Premier Division
Croydon BR FC
Golden Lion
Lewisham Athletic Reserves
Kingsdale
Long Lane 'A'
Metrogas 'A'
Our Lady Seniors
Red Velvet
Thames Borough
Tudor Sports
West Bromley Albion

Division One
Bexlians 'A'
Croydon BR Reserves
Danson Sports
Eltham Town
Farnborough Old Boys Guild 'A'
Iron Tugboat City
Johnson & Phillips Reserves
London Borough
Old Bromleians Reserves
Old Colfeians
Seven Acre Sports
Shirley Town

Source

Recent divisional champions

Source

Other London and Kent Leagues
Main index: Affiliated Leagues in London
There are a number of other leagues that are affiliated to the London Football Association.

Main index: Affiliated Leagues in Kent
There are a number of other leagues that are affiliated to the Kent County Football Association.

References

External links
South London Football Alliance Official Website – Mitoo
South London Football Alliance – Archived Website

 
Football competitions in London
Football leagues in Kent
Football leagues in England
Sports leagues established in 1920
1920 establishments in England